Charles F. Coghlan (December 1, 1896 – March 16, 1972) was American actor and writer.

Biography
Coghlan born in Boston, Massachusetts, was the alleged son of Charles Francis Coghlan and nephew of Rose Coghlan.  Another source has it that Charles F. Coghlan is the son of Elizabeth "Eily" Coghlan, another sister of Charles Francis Coghlan and Rose Coghlan, and a man named Sydney Battam or Bratton. The story has it that Elizabeth "Eily" died in 1900 and Charles F. was adopted by Rose Coghlan. Still another angle has Charles F. being the result of an affair between Rose Coghlan and the Prince of Wales (aka Edward VII). Whatever his origins, Charles F. Coghlan bears a strong resemblance to Rose Coghlan and is buried in the same plot with her. A relative Gertrude Coghlan was the daughter of Rose's brother Charles Coghlan.

Coghlan died in Hershey, Pennsylvania.

Partial filmography
 Jim the Penman (1921)
 Silas Marner (1922)
 The Royal Box (1929) (from his play)

References

External links
 
 
 
 Portrait (New York City Public Library)

American male stage actors
American male silent film actors
1896 births
1972 deaths
20th-century American male actors